Liao Ching-hsien (born 22 June 1994) is a Taiwanese athlete who specialises in the sprinting events. She represented her country at the 2011 World Championships and 2012 World Indoor Championships.

Competition record

Personal bests
Outdoor
100 metres – 11.84 (+0.9 m/s, Changhua 2011)
200 metres – 24.01 (+1.1 m/s, Fuzhou 2011)
Indoor
60 metres – 7.58 (Osaka 2012)

References

1994 births
Living people
Taiwanese female sprinters
Athletes (track and field) at the 2010 Asian Games
Athletes (track and field) at the 2014 Asian Games
Athletes (track and field) at the 2018 Asian Games
Athletes (track and field) at the 2010 Summer Youth Olympics
World Athletics Championships athletes for Chinese Taipei
Asian Games competitors for Chinese Taipei
Competitors at the 2013 Summer Universiade